Tim Kelly (born December 21, 1956) is an American politician. He was a member of the Michigan House of Representatives, first elected in 2012. His district consists of part of Saginaw County.

Prior to his election to the House, Kelly was a member of the Saginaw County Board of Commissioners and chairman of the Saginaw County Republican Party.

He was nominated by President Donald Trump to serve a top position in the Department of Education (Assistant Secretary of Education for Career and Technical Education); however, the administration withdrew the nomination in light of Kelly's statements about women, Muslims, and impoverished parents.

In 2020, Kelly announced that he is running of the United States House of Representatives seat representing Michigan's 5th congressional district. On August 4, 2020, Kelly defeated Earl Lackie in the Republican primary for the congressional seat. On November 3, 2020, Kelly was defeated by incumbent, Dan Kildee.

References

Michigan Secretary of State: Tim Kelly for State Representative

1956 births
21st-century American politicians
County commissioners in Michigan
Living people
Republican Party members of the Michigan House of Representatives
Politicians from Saginaw, Michigan
University of Denver alumni